is a Japanese gravure idol.

Background
Amaki is represented by Watanabe Entertainment. She was formerly affiliated with Alice Project as a member of the Japanese J-pop idol groups Kamen Joshi and Armor Girls. Amaki's sister is Kamen Rider Girls' Ayako Kuroda.

In 2018, Amaki starred in two live action film adaptations of Kazuto Okada's Hop Step Jump! manga series.

Works

Photo albums

Videos

Filmography

Films

Variety shows

Radio programmes

Internet

Stage

Video games

Bibliography

Music group associations
Poissan Iinkai
Pā-ken!
Machikado Keiki Kamen Joshi
Armor Girls
Kamen Joshi
Idol Yōkai Kawayushi
Pureful

References

External links
 – Asia Promotion 
 New Blog
 

Japanese gravure idols
Models from Hyōgo Prefecture
1995 births
Living people